Liudmila Samsonova defeated Zheng Qinwen in the final, 7–5, 7–5 to win the singles tennis title at the 2022 Pan Pacific Open. She did not drop a set en route to her third title of the season. By reaching her first WTA Tour final as a 19-year-old, Zheng became the first Chinese teenager to contest a WTA singles final.

Naomi Osaka was the defending champion from when the event was last held in 2019, but withdrew from her second round match against Beatriz Haddad Maia.

Seeds 
The top four seeds received a bye into the second round.

Draw

Finals

Top half

Bottom half

Qualifying

Seeds

Qualifiers

Qualifying draw

First qualifier

Second qualifier

Third qualifier

Fourth qualifier

Fifth qualifier

Sixth qualifier

References

External links 
 Main draw
 Qualifying draw

Toray Pan Pacific Open - Singles
2022 Singles